Senator the Honourable Randall Mitchell (born 10 January 1979) is a Trinidad and Tobago politician and lawyer who currently serves as the Minister of Tourism, Culture and the Arts since 19 August 2020. He was appointed a senator in the Trinidad and Tobago Senate on 19 August 2020. He is a member of the People's National Movement.  

Mitchell was first elected to represent the San Fernando East constituency on 7 September 2015.  As a member of the Trinidad and Tobago Parliament and then as a senator with the ruling government, he held a number of ministerial positions. He did not contest his seat in the 2020 general election.

Early life 
Mitchell was born in San Fernando, Trinidad and Tobago on 10 January 1978. His parents raised him with his three brothers in Cocoyea, a neighborhood within San Fernando.

Education 
Mitchell attended elementary school at San Fernando Boys R.C. until 1991. He later attended Presentation College in San Fernando.  He played football for Presentation in the  Trinidad and Tobago Secondary Schools Football League and Intercol. 

He received his first post secondary education from the University of London in 2007 and earned a Bachelor of Law degree. He then attended the University of Northumbria, where he graduated with a Master of Laws. At the University of Northumbria, he won the Buchanan Prize (Best Overall BVC student) of Lincoln's Inn for 2007–2008. In 2017, he graduated with a Distinction in the International Master of Business Administration from the Arthur Lok Jack Global School of Business, University of the West Indies.

Politics 
On 11 September 2015, Prime Minister Keith Rowley appointed, Mitchell to be the Minister of Public Administration in the Ministry of Public Administration. 

On 18 March 2016, he became Minister of Housing and Urban Development in the Ministry of Housing and Urban Development.

On 9 April 2018, he became Minister of Tourism (later renamed Minister of Tourism, Culture and the Arts) in the Ministry of Tourism Culture and the Arts.

References

External links 
 www.tourism.gov.tt
www.ttparliament.org

1978 births
Living people
Trinidad and Tobago politicians
Members of the Senate (Trinidad and Tobago)
Members of the House of Representatives (Trinidad and Tobago)
People's National Movement politicians